Alfred Bonogua Kollie, Jr. (1951–2020) was a Liberian politician. Kollie was born November 2, 1951. He hailed from Lofa County.

As of the 1980s, he served as Assistant Minister at the Ministry for Public Works. During a period of the Interim Government of National Unity in the early 1990s Kollie served as Acting Minister for Public Works.

During the First Liberian Civil War Kollie became co-chair of the Liberian Peace Council (LPC). After the Abuja I Accord Kollie was named Minister of Post and Telecommunications in the Liberian National Transitional Government, a role he held between September 1995 and August 1997.

Kollie died on March 5, 2020, at the MedStar Franklin Square Medical Center in Maryland, United States.

References

1951 births
2020 deaths
People from Lofa County
Ministers of Posts and Telecommunications (Liberia)